Coconut Fred's Fruit Salad Island! (or simply Coconut Fred or CFFSI) is a short-lived Flash animated television series created by Sammy Oriti and Don Oriolo that aired for two seasons on Kids' WB from September 17, 2005, to May 27, 2006. The show was produced by Warner Bros. Animation with animation provided by Dong Yang Animation.

Coconut Fred's Fruit Salad Island takes place on an island inhabited exclusively by fruit. The residents enjoy their own tropical paradise without a care in the world; they must share their peaceful utopia with the joyfully strange Coconut Fred, a whimsical, blissfully foolish coconut with the special ability to materialize anything he thinks about. The plot revolves around the adventures of Fred and his friends, as his boundless imagination springs to life while his friends struggle to cover up the collateral. Any conflict could range from getting a “fruit canal”, to sailing off the island only to find themselves in a humongous storm.

Main characters

Coconut Fred (voiced by Rob Paulsen): A happy-go-lucky coconut with a strange imagination. Fred has the special ability to turn whatever he imagines into reality. He can often be heard saying his trademark catchphrases, "Yay, me!" and "Now you're talking, coconut!"
Slip & Slide D'Peel (both voiced by Eric Bauza): 'Country' banana brothers. They are less intelligent than the rest of the cast, and often take things a little too seriously. There is no clear way of telling them apart unless Fred or another character identifies just one of them. They are in a band with Fred called "Coconut Fred's All-Body Sound Band", and their music consists mainly of bodily sounds (burping, rude armpit noises, gargling, etc.).
Bingo Cherry (voiced by Tracey Moore for the first two episodes and by Britt McKillip for the remainder of the series): A shy and timid cherry. Bingo usually hangs out with Fred, Slip and Slide and Bunga Berry. She is easily terrified, something that Fred does not know and usually provokes.
Mr. Mel Greenrind (voiced by Michael Donovan): A watermelon. Most commonly assisted by Bingo, Mr. Greenrind routinely attempts to keep everything and everyone in order on the island with his chart of rules known as the squeaky board. A lot of the rules on the squeaky board are really nonsensical, but all of which can be applied to Coconut Fred and his friends. Fred has a tendency to get on Mr. Greenrind's nerves, and sometimes stress him out from all of his antics, though as the series progresses, he was able to show friendliness towards Fred (which usually would not last long).
Wedgie (voiced by Brian Drummond): A lemon who works as a sailor. He ended up on Fruit Salad Island due to Fred's intervention. Wedgie spends a great deal of time talking to "Betty", the wooden figurehead. He often fabricates plans to escape from the island, all of which are foiled by Fred's antics, either directly or indirectly.
Bunga Berry (Voiced by David Kaye): A wild strawberry. Bunga communicates exclusively in grunts and growls. Despite this, everyone is still able to understand what he is saying, and is docile enough to interact with other islanders calmly.

Others
Butchy (voiced by Eric Bauza): A gravenstein apple. He is well known as the island's troublemaking bully. He enjoys frightening others, like Bingo.
Black Berry: Butchy's secretary. As his name describes, he is a blackberry. Butchy keeps him in his pocket. A parody of the BlackBerry Personal digital assistant.
Tiffany Pears (voiced by Britt McKillip): A famous singer on Fruit Salad Island. Everybody likes her music, except for Mr. Greenrind. In the episode "The Ripley Van Ripend Book of World Records", she had the record for most off-key singer ever to perform in public. Her name is a parody of Britney Spears.
B.L. Tomato (voiced by Ashleigh Ball): An outcast tomato that is trying to find out if he is a fruit or a vegetable (although, a tomato is actually a fruit). In the Season 2 episode "Captain Nut and the Power Fruits", he joined Blendark, Captain Nut's arch-enemy, and turned to the dark side with a new name, the Tomatonator. Aside from the title song, he never starred in any other episode.
Rusty Candu (voiced by David Kaye): Fred's friend. He is a can of fruit. His only appearances are the title song and the episodes "Hocus Pocus Lack of Focus", "Amuse-Otel", and "Fred Rules" (in a cameo).
Slurpy (voiced by Michael Donovan): A fruit bat who is bent on eating Fruit Salad Island inhabitants. He is afraid of the light.
Melonie Greenrind (voiced by Kelly Sheridan): Mr. Greenrind's perky niece. She likes to enforce rules even more than her uncle, and carries around a very noisy chalkboard.
Vic the Alien: An alien from Loft Lost 57 in the Sasaft Quadrant in the depths of other space. After being mistaken as a tourist to Fred and the island, he was actually planning to invade the island with his spaceship fleet, but because of Fred and his friends playing in his ship and almost destroying them by going into black holes and ramming into asteroids, he aborted the invasion and Fred crashed the ship into Mr. Greenrind's sand castle cabana. They all survived the crash. He only appeared in "Turn On Your Nut Light".
Mrs. Plumcott (voiced by Kathleen Barr): The token little old plum lady of the island. She hates Mr. Greenrind. Her catchphrase is "Oh, dear."
Dr. Bartlett (voiced by Brian Drummond impersonating Ed Wynn): Dr. Bartlett is a pear dentist on Fruit Salad Island.

Reception
Despite some critics praising the animation and creativity, as well as some elements of the comedy, the series has been criticized for its often loud, over-the-top humor. Joly Herman of Common Sense Media posted a review of Coconut Fred's Fruit Salad Island on Go.com. The review describes the show as "the TV equivalent of sugary cereal, and nothing more", and proceeded to give the show 2 stars out of 5.

Despite numerous claims, Rob Paulsen did not regret or hate voicing Fred, as he said to a fan on San Diego Comic-Con that it was just a gig that he got paid for, and by no means was he a fan but he was not mad about it. Additionally, in a QnA section of the new release of "Voice Lessons", he says he did not have any problem with Coconut Fred and Bubsy. However, he does think of the show as the writers version of SpongeBob SquarePants.

Series overview

Episodes
Each episode was directed by Matt Danner.

Season 1 (2005)

Season 2 (2006)

References

Notes

External links

 

Kids' WB original shows
2000s American animated television series
2005 American television series debuts
2006 American television series endings
2000s Canadian animated television series
2005 Canadian television series debuts
2006 Canadian television series endings
American children's animated adventure television series
American children's animated comedy television series
Canadian children's animated adventure television series
Canadian children's animated comedy television series
The WB original programming
Teletoon original programming
Television series by Warner Bros. Animation
American flash animated television series
Canadian flash animated television series
English-language television shows
Fictional islands
Television shows set on islands
Television shows filmed in Vancouver